The canton of Descartes is an administrative division of the Indre-et-Loire department, central France. Its borders were modified at the French canton reorganisation which came into effect in March 2015. Its seat is in Descartes.

It consists of the following communes:
 
Abilly
Barrou
Betz-le-Château
Bossay-sur-Claise
Bossée
Bournan
Boussay
La Celle-Guenand
La Celle-Saint-Avant
Chambon
La Chapelle-Blanche-Saint-Martin
Charnizay
Chaumussay
Ciran
Civray-sur-Esves
Cussay
Descartes
Draché
Esves-le-Moutier
Ferrière-Larçon
Le Grand-Pressigny
La Guerche
Ligueil
Louans
Le Louroux
Manthelan
Marcé-sur-Esves
Mouzay
Neuilly-le-Brignon
Paulmy
Le Petit-Pressigny
Preuilly-sur-Claise
Saint-Flovier
Sepmes
Tournon-Saint-Pierre
Varennes
Vou
Yzeures-sur-Creuse

References

Cantons of Indre-et-Loire